Mac Cú Ceanain (died 1021) was King of Uí Díarmata.

Biography

A son of Cú Ceanain mac Tadhg, first name unknown, is noted as king of Uí Díarmata at his death in 1021. His father, though never king himself, had died fighting against the then king in a succession war in 991. From the reign of his son, became the ancestor of all subsequent kings, and the dynasty took their surname, O Concannon, from him. 

The Annals of the Four Masters report his death: The son of Cuceanann, lord of Ui-Diarmada, was slain by the Ui-Gadhra (see Kings of Sliabh Lugha).

References

 The Tribes and Customs of Hy-Many, John O'Donovan, 1843
 The Parish of Ballinasloe, Fr. Jerome A. Fahey.
 https://www.webcitation.org/query?url=http://www.geocities.com/Athens/Aegean/2444/irish/LD.htm&date=2009-10-25+05:47:51
 Vol. 2 (AD 903–1171): edition and translation
 Annals of Ulster at CELT: Corpus of Electronic Texts at University College Cork
 Annals of Tigernach at CELT: Corpus of Electronic Texts at University College Cork
Revised edition of McCarthy's synchronisms at Trinity College Dublin..

People from County Galway
1021 deaths
11th-century Irish monarchs
Year of birth unknown